Prymorske (meaning "seaside") may refer to several places in Ukraine:

Donetsk Oblast
 Prymorske, former village that merged with Mariupol
 Prymorske, village in Novoazovsk Raion
 Prymorske, former name of Urzuf, village in Manhush Raion

Kharkiv Oblast
 Prymorske, village in Pechenihy Raion

Kherson Oblast
 Prymorske, village in Henichesk Raion
 Prymorske, village in Kalanchak Raion

Odessa Oblast
 Prymorske, village in Bilhorod-Dnistrovskyi Raion
 Prymorske, village in Kiliya Raion
 Prymorske, village in Tatarbunary Raion

Zaporizhzhia Oblast
 Prymorske, village in Vasylivka Raion

See also
 Primorsky (disambiguation)
 Prymorsk, city in Zaporizhzhia Oblast, Ukraine